Myrsine bullata is a species of plant in the family Primulaceae. It is endemic to Peru.

References

Endemic flora of Peru
Trees of Peru
bullata
Vulnerable plants
Taxonomy articles created by Polbot